Ultimatum: Ceasefire! is a 1987 Filipino action film directed by Wilfredo Milan, Bert R. Mendoza and Jerry O. Tirazona. The film stars Ramon Revilla, Eddie Garcia, Marianne de la Riva, Aurora Sevilla, Conrad Poe, Nick Romano, Joonee Gamboa, Renato del Prado, Ernie Ortega, and Lala Montelibano. Produced by Urban Films, it was released on April 2, 1987.

Critic Justino Dormiendo of the Manila Standard gave the film a negative review, disparaging it as "a gross distortion of political realities that have engulfed our nation [...] in the last 365 days."

Cast
Ramon Revilla as Kumander Ibarra
Eddie Garcia as Col. Gregorio Santos
Marianne de la Riva
Aurora Sevilla
Conrad Poe
Nick Romano
Joonee Gamboa as the warlord
Renato del Prado
Ernie Ortega
Lala Montelibano as a beerhouse dancer
Victoria Dimaranan
Rafael Soquez
Joseph Serra
Johnny Vicar
Danny Riel
Miguel Soquez

Production
Shooting for Ultimatum: Ceasefire! began on February 12, 1987. A day later, lead actor Ramon Revilla broke his leg and had to recover for some time at his residence in Imus, Cavite. It was during this time that Revilla was convinced by his friends to run for senator in the 1987 Senate elections.

Release
Ultimatum: Ceasefire! was released in theaters on April 2, 1987.

Critical response
Justino Dormiendo, writing for the Manila Standard, gave the film a negative review. He largely criticized the film's misguided presentation of how the insurgency issue then afflicting Philippine society could develop and thus disparaged it as "a gross distortion of political realities that have engulfed our nation [...] in the last 365 days." Dormiendo also criticized Ramon Revilla's acting and the casting of Joonee Gamboa as the warlord.

References

External links

1987 films
1987 action films
Filipino-language films
Films about rebels
Philippine action films
Films directed by Willy Milan